Peterborough Tramways served the city of Peterborough from 24 January 1903 until 15 November 1930.

Infrastructure
From its southmost limit, the Market Place (grid reference ), the network had three routes:
 along Westgate and Lincoln Road to a terminus at the junction with Sage's Lane at grid reference  (Walton)
 along Westgate, Lincoln Road and Dogsthorpe Road to a terminus at the junction with St Pauls Road at grid reference  (Dogsthorpe)
 along Midgate, New Road and Eastfield Road to a terminus at the junction with Eye Road at grid reference  (Newark)

The depot was located on the east side of Lincoln Road at grid reference . Millfield Bus Depot now occupies the site.

Tramcars
The fleet, in a livery of lake-brown and cream (later holly green and cream), consisted of:
 14 Brush Electrical Machines open top double deck tramcars

Closure
The system's owners started to introduce motorbuses in 1913 to supplement the trams. Ultimately Peterborough's electric tram system was superseded by a motorbus system which was an original component of the Eastern Counties Omnibus Company.

References

External links
 Pictures of and information about Peterborough trams.
 Peterborough Tramways trams and uniformed staff
 Peterborough Tramways button.

See also
List of town tramway systems in the United Kingdom

Tram transport in England
Transport
Rail transport in Cambridgeshire
3 ft 6 in gauge railways in England